Khanik may refer to:

 Al-Khalidiyah, al-Hasakah Governorate, a village in Syria
 Mağaracık, Nusaybin, a village in Turkey

Iran 
 Khanik, Fars
 Khanik, Razavi Khorasan
 Khanik, Boshruyeh, South Khorasan
 Khanik, Eresk, South Khorasan
 Khanik, Ferdows, South Khorasan
 Khanik, Beradust, Urmia County, West Azerbaijan Province
 Khanik, Sumay-ye Shomali, Urmia County, West Azerbaijan Province
 Khanik, Zanjan

See also
 Khunik (disambiguation)
 Nowkhanik